The Medan–Kuala Namu–Tebing Tinggi Toll Road or MKTT toll road is an expressway that connects Medan, Kualanamu International Airport and Tebing Tinggi, in Sumatra, Indonesia. This toll road is part of Trans-Sumatra Toll Road network. The toll road also connects the industrial area in Medan, Kualanamu International Airport, Kuala Tanjung Port, Sei Mangkei Special Economic Zone and the access to Lake Toba.

Sections
It is in two sections:
 Section-1 Medan–Perbarakan–Kuala Namu, 17.8 kilometers. Section I was built by the Indonesian government. The first stone laying of the commencement of the construction was carried out on 23 September 2014 and is now operational.
 Section-2 Perbarakan–Tebing Tinggi, 44.0 kilometers. Section II was built by the Consortium of BUMN consisting of Jasa Marga, Pembangunan Perumahan, Waskita Karya, and Hutama Karya.

Exits

Tanjung Morawa-Tebing Tinggi Section

Perbarakan Link

See also
Trans-Sumatra Toll Road

References

Toll roads in Sumatra
Kualanamu International Airport
Toll roads in Indonesia
Transport in North Sumatra